Eshaqvand-e Sofla (also Romanized as Esḩāqvand-e Soflá; also known as Esḩāqvand, ‘Īsá Khān-e Pā’īn, ‘Īsá Khān-e Soflá, and Issakvān) is a village in Cheshmeh Kabud Rural District, in the Central District of Harsin County, Kermanshah Province, Iran. At the 2006 census, its population was 148, in 28 families.

References 

Populated places in Harsin County